Magical thinking in various forms is a cultural universal and an important aspect of religion. Magic is prevalent in all societies, regardless of whether they have organized religion or more general systems of animism or shamanism. Religion and magic became conceptually separated with the development of western monotheism, where the distinction arose between supernatural events sanctioned by mainstream religious doctrine (miracles) and magic rooted in folk belief or occult speculation.
In pre-monotheistic religious traditions, there is no fundamental distinction between religious practice and magic; tutelary deities concerned with magic are sometimes called hermetic deities or spirit guides.

Magical practices in prehistory

Anthropological and psychological perspectives 

It is a postulate of modern anthropology, at least since early 1930s, that there is complete continuity between magic and religion.

Robert Ranulph Marett (1932) said:

Ernst Cassirer (1944) wrote:

Functional differences between religion and magic
Early sociological interpretations of magic by Marcel Mauss and Henri Hubert emphasized the social conditions in which the phenomenon of magic develops. According to them, religion is the expression of a social structure and serves to maintain the cohesion of a community (religion is therefore public) and magic is an individualistic action (and therefore private).

Ralph Merrifield, the British archaeologist credited as producing the first full-length volume dedicated to a material approach to magic, defined the differences between religion and magic: 
"'Religion' is used to indicate the belief in supernatural or spiritual beings; 'magic', the use of practices intended to bring occult forces under control and so to influence events; 'ritual', prescribed or customary behaviour that may be religious, if it is intended to placate or win favour of supernatural beings, magical if it is intended to operate through impersonal forces of sympathy or by controlling supernatural beings, or social if its purpose is to reinforce a social organisation or facilitate social intercourse".

In 1991 Henk Versnel argued that magic and religion function in different ways and that these can be broadly defined in four areas: Intention - magic is employed to achieve clear and immediate goals for an individual, whereas religion is less purpose-motivated and has its sights set on longer-term goals; Attitude – magic is manipulative as the process is in the hands of the user, “instrumental coercive manipulation”, opposed to the religious attitude of “personal and supplicative negotiation”; Action – magic is a technical exercise that often requires professional skills to fulfil an action, whereas religion is not dependent upon these factors but the will and sentiment of the gods; Social – the goals of magic run counter to the interests of a society (in that personal gain for an individual gives them an unfair advantage over peers), whereas religion has more benevolent and positive social functions.

This separation of the terms 'religion' and 'magic' in a functional sense is disputed. It has been argued that abandoning the term magic in favour of discussing "belief in spiritual beings" will help to create a more meaningful understanding of all associated ritual practices. However using the word 'magic' alongside 'religion' is one method of trying to understand the supernatural world, even if some other term can eventually take its place.

Religious practices and magic
Both magic and religion contain rituals. 
Most cultures have or have had in their past some form of magical tradition that recognizes a shamanistic interconnectedness of spirit. This may have been long ago, as a folk tradition that died out with the establishment of a major world religion, such as Judaism, Christianity, Islam or Buddhism, or it may still co-exist with that world religion. Coptic Christians were writing magical spells from the 1st to 12th centuries.

Names of the gods 
There is a long-standing belief in the power of true names, this often descends from the magical belief that knowing a being's true name grants  power over it.

If names have power, then knowing the name of a god regarded as supreme in a religion should grant the greatest power of all.  This belief is reflected in traditional Wicca, where the names of the Goddess and the Horned God - the two supreme deities in Wicca - are usually held as a secret to be revealed only to initiates. This belief is also reflected in ancient Judaism, which used the Tetragrammaton (YHWH, usually translated as "Lord" in small caps) to refer to God in the Tanakh. The same belief is seen in Hinduism, but with different conclusions; rather, attaining transcendence and the power of God is seen as a good thing.  Thus, some Hindus chant the name of their favorite deities as often as possible, the most common being Krishna.

Magic and Abrahamic religion

Magic and Abrahamic religions have had a somewhat checkered past.  The King James Version of the Bible included the famous translation "Thou shalt not suffer a witch to live" (Exodus 22:18), and Saul is rebuked by God for seeking advice from a diviner who could contact spirits. On the other hand, seemingly magical signs are documented in the Bible: For example, both the staff of Pharaoh's sorcerers as well as the staff of Moses and Aaron could be turned into snakes (Exodus 7:8-13). However, as Scott Noegel points out, the critical difference between the magic of Pharaoh's magicians and the non-magic of Moses is in the means by which the staff becomes a snake. For the Pharaoh's magicians, they employed "their secret arts" whereas Moses merely throws down his staff to turn it into a snake. To an ancient Egyptian, the startling difference would have been that Moses neither employed secret arts nor magical words. In the Torah, Noegel points out that YHWH does not need magical rituals to act.

The words 'witch' and 'witchcraft' appear in some English versions of the Bible. One verse that is probably responsible for more deaths of suspected witches than any other passage from the Hebrew Scriptures (Old Testament) is Exodus 22:18. In the King James Version, this reads: "Thou shalt not suffer a witch to live." The precise meaning of the Hebrew word mechshepha (root kashaph) here translated as 'witch' and in some other modern versions, 'sorceress', is uncertain. In the Septuagint it was translated as pharmakeia, meaning 'pharmacy', and on this basis, Reginald Scot claimed in the 16th century that 'witch' was an incorrect translation and poisoners were intended.

See also 

 Astrotheology
 Benedicaria (folk religious practice in Italy)
 Ceremonial magic
 Christian mysticism
 Kabbalah
 Magic in the Graeco-Roman world
 Myth and ritual
 Religion and mythology
 Sexuality in Christian demonology
 Shem HaMephorash
 Western esotericism
 Zionist churches (African beliefs and Christianity)

References

Further reading
 Versluis, Arthur (1986). The Philosophy of Magic. Routledge & Megan Paul.

Anthropology of religion
Religion, Magic and
Religion, Magic and

fr:Magie et Religion
pt:Magia
Religious controversies